The Ten Idylls, known as Pattuppāṭṭu or Ten Lays, is an anthology of ten longer poems in the Sangam literature – the earliest known Tamil literature. They range between about 100 and 800 lines, and the collection includes the celebrated Nakkīrar's Tirumurukāṟṟuppaṭai (lit. "Guide to Lord Murukan"). The collection was termed as "Ten Idylls" during the colonial era, though this title is considered "very incorrect" by Kamil Zvelebil – a scholar of Tamil literature and history. He suggests "Ten Lays" as the more apt title. Five of these ten ancient poems are lyrical, narrative bardic guides (arruppatai) by which poets directed other bards to the patrons of arts such as kings and chieftains. The others are guides to religious devotion (Murugan) and to major towns, sometimes mixed with akam- or puram-genre poetry.

The Pattuppāṭṭu collection is a later dated collection, with its earliest layer composed sometime between 2nd and 3rd century CE, the middle between 2nd and 4th century, while the last layer sometime between 3rd and 5th century CE.

The collection
According to Zvelebil, the Pattuppāṭṭu compilation is as follows:

Inscriptions
Two Shaivite Hindu temple inscriptions have been discovered in Tamil Nadu which allude to and quote lines from the Pattuppāṭṭu collection. The first found in one of the inscriptions at Veerateeswarar temple is dated 1012 CE and attributed to Rajaraja I. The inscription is in the form of an Pattuppāṭṭu arruppatai in the same meter as those found in Pattuppāṭṭu, and alludes to the poet Kapilar. The second inscription is found in Rishabeshwarar temple in Chengam. Its author and patron are unknown, but palaeographically from the 12th-century Chola period. The inscription quotes lines from this collection and mentions the title Mali-katam-pattu (an anagram of Malaipaṭukaṭām). These inscription show that the collection of these poems were an integral part of the Shaiva tradition literature and revered in the context of their temples.

Publication
U. V. Swaminatha Iyer rediscovered the palm-leaf manuscripts of the Pattuppāṭṭu along with other Sangam literature in Shaiva monasteries during the late 19th century. The Ten Idylls were published in 1889. Over time, additional manuscripts – suggesting some early rediscoveries were partially damaged and incomplete – were discovered in temples, monasteries and private collections in India. Eva Wilden has compiled and published a catalog of important manuscripts of Pattuppāṭṭu preserved in major libraries.

Translations
 Pattupattu – Ten Tamil Idylls by J. V. Chellaih (1946)
 Ancient Tamil Classic Pattuppattu in English (The Ten Tamil Idylls) by A. Dakshinamurthy (2012)

See also
 Hindu texts
 Sangam literature

Notes

References

Bibliography

 A. Dakshinamurthy, Ancient Tamil Classic Pattuppattu in English (The Ten Tamil Idylls), Thamizh Academy, SRM University, 2013. 
 
 Mudaliyar, Singaravelu A., Apithana Cintamani, An encyclopaedia of Tamil Literature, (1931) - Reprinted by Asian Educational Services, New Delhi (1983)
 
 
 Selby, Martha Ann (2011) Tamil Love Poetry: The Five Hundred Short Poems of the Aiṅkuṟunūṟu, an Early Third-Century Anthology. Columbia University Press, 

 
 

Sangam literature
Partially lost Tamil literary works
Tamil Hindu literature